Lung Kwu Tan is an area located in the western part of the Tuen Mun District in Hong Kong.

Geography
The area is located to the southwest of Castle Peak and consists of Lung Kwu Tan and Lung Kwu Sheung Tan. Lung Kwu Tan is a beach with black sand.

Administration
Lung Kwu Tan Village is a recognized village under the New Territories Small House Policy. It is one of the 36 villages represented within the Tuen Mun Rural Committee. Lung Kwu Tan Village Representative Lau Wong-fat was the chairman of the Heung Yee Kuk in 1980-2015 and an influential figure in rural Hong Kong politics.

History
Lung Kwu Tan Village has a history of a few hundred years.

In 2021, police in the area seized 10 speedboats and a record 57 engines, both used for illegal smuggling, in a 100,000 sqft warehouse belonging to a company owned by Kenneth Lau and his family.

Features
Visitors attractions in Lung Kwu Tan include the local Tin Hau Temple at Pak Long and Bogy's Rock. While Lung Kwu Tan is a place of primitive simplicity, the opening of privately run barbecue sites have always drawn crowds of holidaymakers. Rare, endangered Chinese white dolphins can be observed from shores.

The Lau Ancestral Hall in Tuk Mei Chung village, part of Lung Kwu Tan, is a Grade III historic building.

The Emperor's Cave
It is said that Emperor Bing of Song (12711279) of the Southern Song Dynasty went south as far as Lung Kwu Tan as he fled from the invading Mongols in the north. There is a cave at Lung Kwu Tan, which became known as the Emperor's Cave and is believed to be where Emperor Bing took refuge during his stay. During the period of Japanese occupation, the Dong Jiang guerrilla force made the cave one of its military bases to put up resistance against the Japanese.

Transportation
The village is connected to the LRT via route Nos 610, 614, 615 and 507 which in turn connect to the Tuen Mun Ferry Pier stop via MTR Bus route No. K52.

Education
Lung Kwu Tan is in Primary One Admission (POA) School Net 70. Within the school net are multiple aided schools (operated independently but funded with government money) and the following government schools: Tuen Mun Government Primary School (屯門官立小學).

See also
 Tuen Mun Rural Committee
 Black Point Power Station

References

External links

 Delineation of area of existing village Lung Kwu Tan (Tuen Mun) for election of resident representative (2019 to 2022)
 Antiquities Advisory Board. Historic Building Appraisal. Lau Ancestral Hall, Tuk Mei Chung. Pictures

Areas of Hong Kong
Tuen Mun District